Stanisław Skrzeszewski (April 27, 1901 in Nowy Sącz — December 20, 1978 in Warsaw) was a Polish communist politician, educator and prominent statesman of the Polish People's Republic.

Biography 
Born in to the family of a train conductor, Skrzeszewski was active in socialist circles from his teenage years. From 1920 he worked as a village teacher and studied at the Faculty of Philosophy of the Jagiellonian University and received a doctorate in philosophy. 

Fom 1921, he belonged to communist youth circles. From 1922 a member of the Communist Youth Union and from 1924 a member of the Communist Party of Poland. He was arrested in 1924, he was released thanks to the intervention of Władysław Heinrich. Not admitted to work at the university, he left for France. where from 1925–1926 he studied philosophy and general methodology at the Sorbonne. There he maintained contacts with the French Communist Party, but wasn't involved in political activity. In the years 1926–1928 he was a teacher at the gymnasium in Dębica, where he founded the first cell of the KPP.

Arrested again on April 20, 1932, imprisoned in Krakow for five weeks. From the end of 1934 he was a contract lecturer of pedagogy and didactics at the State Pedagogium in Krakow. At the same time, he was active in the communist faction of the Polish Teachers' Union. He continued his career by working in Jagiellonian University. 

After the Nazi Invasion of Poland on September 3, 1939, he left Kraków and after the Soviet invasion of Poland, he stayed in Lviv under the Soviet occupation. From November 1939 to January 1940 he was a lecturer at the Pedagogical Institute, later a researcher at the Institute of Teacher Training. In the second half of June 1941 he was summoned to Kiev in order to obtain - as a former member of the KPP, membership rights in the All-Union Communist Party (b). After the start of the German-Soviet war, he was evacuated deep into the USSR and worked as a teacher. Summoned to Moscow, he took part in the congress of the Union of Polish Patriots. at the congress, he delivered a lecture on cultural and educational matters and was elected to the main board of the union. From 1944, a member of the Polish Workers' Party and from 1945 to 1948 he was a member of the Central Committee of the party.

In 1944 he was the head of the Department of Education in the Polish Committee of National Liberation and from in 1944 to 1945 he was the Minister of Education. In the years 1945 to 1947 he served the Polish ambassador to France. in the years 1947 to 1950 he once agaon served as the Minister of Education. From 1948, he was a member of the Polish United Workers' Party and later on the Polish United Workers Party. From in 1948 to 1959 he was a member of its Central Committee and then, from 1959 to 1968 he member of the Central Audit Committee of the Polish United Workers' Party. In 1950–1951, he was undersecretary of state and deputy minister of the Ministry of Foreign Affairs and from 1951 to 1956 Skrzeszewski served as the Minister of Foreign Affairs. In 1956-1957, secretary of the State Council and from 1957 to 1969 he was the head of the Chancellery of the Sejm.

In 1953 he was a candidate put forward by the USSR for the post of UN Secretary General after Trygve Lie resigned.

In November 1949 he became a member of the National Committee for the Celebration of the 70th anniversary of the birth of Joseph Stalin.

Skrzeszewski died on December 20, 1978 and received a state funeral.

References

1901 births
1978 deaths
People from Nowy Sącz
Polish communists
Communist Party of Poland politicians
Polish educators
Polish Workers' Party politicians
Polish United Workers' Party members
Members of the Central Committee of the Polish United Workers' Party
Members of the State National Council
Polish diplomats
Ambassadors of Poland to France
Ministers of Foreign Affairs of Poland
Education ministers of Poland
Jagiellonian University alumni
Commanders of the Order of Polonia Restituta
Recipients of the Order of the Banner of Work
Burials at Powązki Military Cemetery